KOUS-LP (96.3 FM) is an urban oldies formatted radio station in Monroe, Louisiana.

External links

Urban oldies radio stations in the United States
Radio stations established in 2003
Radio stations in Louisiana